Pentosyltransferases are a type of glycosyltransferase that catalyze the transfer of a pentose.

Examples include:
 adenine phosphoribosyltransferase
 hypoxanthine-guanine phosphoribosyltransferase
 pertussis toxin
 poly ADP ribose polymerase

They are classified under EC number 2.4.2.

External links
 

EC 2.4.2